SŽ series 310 is a high-speed tilting EMU used on the InterCitySlovenija premium train service in Slovenia, operated by Slovenske železnice since September 24, 2000. It is based on the Italian ETR 460 commonly known as Pendolino. The train is capable of reaching a maximum speed of 200 km/h. The train is electric single system - 3 kV DC.

InterCitySlovenija links the major cities of Slovenia in one line: Ljubljana, Celje and Maribor, with frequent service that acts as a high-speed shuttle. Tilting trains can reach a maximum speed of 160 km/h on the sections Maribor - Pragersko, Pragersko - Slovenska Bistrica and Grobelno - Sentjur.  The train is made up of three cars: two 2nd class cars and one 1st class car. The trains provide disabled access, as well as an onboard Wi-Fi and a snack bar.

Slovenske železnice bought in the year 2000 three trainsets, which currently (December 2020) operate on the Ljubljana-Maribor and Hodoš-Koper routes. Until December 10, 2016, in summer, on Saturdays and Sundays, as well as on public holidays, InterCity Slovenia (ICS) trains also operated a return service between Maribor and Koper via Ljubljana.

As regards international services, one SŽ series 310 trainset operated on the Ljubljana-Venice Santa Lucia route as EC 50/51 Casanova from December 14, 2003, to April 1, 2008.  From 12.12.2004 to 10.12.2005 Eurocity Casanova linked Maribor to Venice via Ljubljana, with Intercity connections from and to Graz in Austria.

Technical Data - EMU 310/316

Manufacturer: Fiat Ferroviaria, Italy

Year of production: 2000

Trainset formation: MU 310 + COACH 316 + MU 310

Wheel arrangement: (1Ao)(Ao1)+ 2'2'+ (1Ao)(Ao1)

Voltage: 3 kV DC

Auxiliary voltage: 380 V 50 Hz

Battery voltage: 72 V DC

Aux. light: 24 V DC

Power: 2 x 2 x 500 kW = 2000 kW

Heating power: 108 kW

Max speed / 200 km/h

Max speed (hauled with locomotive): 80 km/h

Weight: MU 310 51 t , Coach 316 50 t , Trainset 152 t

Service weight: MU 310 55 t + 56 t , Coach 316 53 t , Trainset 164 t

Length over couplers: MU 310 27.2 m , Coach 316 25.0 m , Trainset 81.2 m

Width: 2,800mm

Height: 3,730mm

Axle load t/axle: MU 310 14.0 ,Coach 316 13.3

Linear load t/m: MU 310 2.0 , Coach 316 2.0 , Trainset 2.0

Wheel diameter: 890mm

Brakes: Pneum. SAB - WABCO

EP

ED

MG(3x)

man.(3x)

Braking mass: Pneumatic + EM brake: MU 310 118 t + 120 t , Coach 316 113 t , Trainset 351 t

Braking mass: Pneumatic: MU 310 95 t + 97 t , Coach 316 92 t , Trainset 284 t

Braking mass: Manual: MU 310 17 t , Coach 316 14 t , Trainset 48 t

Braking percentage: Pneumatic + EM brake: MU 310 215% + 214% , Coach 316 213% , Trainset 214%

Braking percentage: Pneumatic: MU 310 173% + 173% , Coach 316 174% , Trainset 173%

Dead man: Parizzi

Speedometer: Deuta

PZB: Indusi I 60 R

Radio: AEG

Minimum turning radius: open railroad 250 m , workshop 110 m

Number of coupled trains: 3

Tilting: hydraulic 8°

Air conditioning , Bar , Telephone . Number of 1st class seats: MU 310: 30

Number of 2nd class seats: MU 310: 30 + 62 + 2 (inv)

Coach 316: 42

Trainset: 134 + 2 (inv.)

Total Number of seats: 164 + 2 additional (inv.) = 166

Crew: one man crew

Purpose: for IC trains

Source: Slovenske železnice Group

References

External links
 
 Map of Slovenian rail network
 ICS Pendolino SŽ 310 - YouTube Playlist - 55 videos 

Pendolino
Electric multiple units of Slovenia
3000 V DC multiple units